No Oblivion is the second studio album by rock band No Devotion. It was released on 16 September 2022 through Velocity Records. It is the first album from the band to not feature previous members Luke Johnson, Jamie Oliver and Mike Lewis, who all departed the band. It is also the first of the band's releases not to be released by Collect Records, which folded after the company severed ties with Martin Shkreli who was revealed to be a silent investor in the label.

Track listing
All songs written by No Devotion.

Personnel
No Devotion
 Geoff Rickly – lead vocals
 Lee Gaze – lead guitar, backing vocals
 Stuart Richardson – bass guitar, piano, keyboards, synths

References

2022 albums
No Devotion albums